PR TIMES, Inc. is a Japanese public relations company headquartered in Minato, Tokyo. The main business is the operation of the press release distribution service of the same name and the support of corporate public relations and public hearing activities. Established in December 2005, market changed from TSE Mothers to TSE First Section in August 2018. Subsidiary of Vector Inc.

The company is one of the constituents of the JPX Nikkei Mid and Small Cap Index.

Overview

The company operates the "PR TIMES" service that widely distributes announcement materials and press releases (news releases) for the media created by companies, government offices, local governments, etc. The distribution site with the same name can be viewed by members of the media as well as the general public.

As of February 2021, more than 50,000 companies and 50% of listed companies use it. It delivers more than 20,000 press releases per month, and page views (PV) exceeded 60 million at the highest.。

The PR Times has partnered with about 200 media, including the digital versions of major national newspapers (The Asahi Shimbun, Sankei Shimbun, Mainichi Shimbun, Yomiuri Shimbun), and press releases are reprinted in the original.

References

External links
 株式会社PR TIMES

Public relations companies
Companies based in Tokyo
Companies established in 2005
2016 initial public offerings